is a Japanese anime screenwriter, light novelist, and manga artist, noted for authoring the series composition of such works as Read or Die, Now and Then, Here and There, Kamichu!, and Gun Sword. He has been a member of Yōsuke Kuroda's creative group Studio Orphee since 2003, and has collaborated with Kuroda on many series, including Hellsing Ultimate, Drifters, and Goblin Slayer.

Screenwriting

Anime television series
 series head writer denoted in bold
Magical Project S (1996-1997)
Battle Athletes Victory (1997-1998)
Android Announcer Maico 2010 (1998)
Excel Saga (1999)
Now and Then, Here and There (1999)
Brigadoon: Marin & Melan (2000)
R.O.D the TV (2003)
Kamichu! (2005)
Gun X Sword (2005)
Bamboo Blade (2007)
Kannagi: Crazy Shrine Maidens (2007)
Samurai Harem: Asu no Yoichi (2009)
Whispered Words (2009)
Oreimo (2010-2011)
The World God Only Knows (2010-2011)
Dragon Crisis! (2011)
 Ore no Imōto ga Konna ni Kawaii Wake ga Nai. (2013)
The World God Only Knows: Goddesses (2013)
Tokyo Ravens (2013)
Samurai Flamenco (2013-2014)
Recently, My Sister Is Unusual (2014)
Nanana's Buried Treasure (2014)
Tokyo ESP (2014)
The Fruit of Grisaia (2014)
 The Eden of Grisaia (2015)
Maria the Virgin Witch (2015)
Scorching Ping Pong Girls (2016)
Drifters (2016)
Made in Abyss (2017)
Goblin Slayer (2018)
Girls' Frontline (2022)
Made in Abyss: The Golden City of the Scorching Sun (2022)
Goblin Slayer II (2023)
Rurouni Kenshin (2023)

OVAs
 Magical Girl Pretty Sammy (1996)
 Parade Parade (1996)
 Matou Kitan Zankan (1996-1997)
 Battle Athletes (1997)
 Magical Play 3D (2001)
 Read or Die (2001)
 Milkyway (2003)
 Hellsing Ultimate (2006-2012)
 Kaitō Tenshi Twin Angel (2008)
 Ikki Tousen: Shūgaku Tōshi Keppu-roku (2012)
 Goblin Slayer: Goblin’s Crown (2020)

Films
 Welcome to the Space Show (2010)
 The Labyrinth of Grisaia (2015)

Bibliography

As a novelist 
Merriment Carrying Caravan - Sabaku no Shirakage
Train+Train
Read or Die

As a manga original writer 
TRAIN+TRAIN
Cloth Road
Read or Dream
Samurai Rising
HandxRed

References

External links 
 Studio ORPHEE's Official Website
 Unofficial fan site

 
1968 births
Anime screenwriters
20th-century Japanese novelists
21st-century Japanese novelists
Light novelists
Living people
People from Okayama Prefecture